Yoshizumi (written: 良純, 宜純, 佳純, 義澄 or 義処) is a masculine Japanese given name. Notable people with the name include:

, Japanese shōgun
, Japanese weather forecaster, television personality and actor
, Japanese molecular biologist
, Japanese footballer
, Japanese daimyō
, Japanese rugby union player

Yoshizumi (written: 吉住) is also a Japanese surname. Notable people with the surname include:

, Japanese politician
, Japanese voice actress
, Japanese manga artist

Japanese-language surnames
Japanese masculine given names